Mónica Lei Scaccia (born 1971 in Caracas, Venezuela) is a Venezuelan model and beauty pageant titleholder who won Miss World Venezuela who placed fourth runner-up to Miss World 1993 as Miss World Americas.

Miss World Venezuela
Lei competed in 1993 as Miss Distrito Federal in her country's national beauty pageant, Miss Venezuela, obtaining the title of Miss World Venezuela.

Miss World 1993

As the official representative of her country to the 1993 Miss World pageant held in Sun City, South Africa on November 27, 1993, she became Miss World Americas and fourth runner-up to eventual winner Lisa Hanna of Jamaica.

References

External links
Miss Venezuela Official Website
Miss World Official Website

1971 births
Living people
People from Caracas
Miss Venezuela World winners
Miss World 1993 delegates